Seman is an unincorporated community located in Elmore County, Alabama, United States, located along Alabama State Route 9,  north-northwest of Eclectic.

History
Seman is most likely named for the Seman family, who were early settlers of the area. A post office operated under the name Seman from 1902 to 1968.

Notable person
 James F. Blake, bus driver whom Rosa Parks defied in 1955, prompting the Montgomery bus boycott

References 

Unincorporated communities in Elmore County, Alabama
Unincorporated communities in Alabama